Columbus Regional Health (CRH) is a regional health care system located in Columbus, Indiana. The health system's primary location, Columbus Regional Hospital, was founded as Bartholomew County Hospital in 1917 and later renamed in 1992. In the fall of 2011, the organization introduced Columbus Regional Health as the new name for the hospital and health system.
Columbus Regional Health serves a 10-county region in southeastern Indiana. The hospital has 1,650 employees and over 225 physicians providing emergency and surgical services and comprehensive care in numerous specialty areas.

48th Vice president of United States Mike Pence was born in Bartholomew County Hospital on 7 June 1959

Facilities
The Columbus Regional Health system includes multiple facilities:
Columbus Regional Hospital, Columbus, Indiana
Columbus Adult Medicine, Columbus, Indiana
Columbus Diagnostic Imaging, Columbus, Indiana
Columbus ENT & Allergy, Columbus, Indiana
Columbus Family Medicine, Columbus, Indiana
Columbus Gynecology, Columbus, Indiana
Columbus Internal Medicine Associates, Columbus, Indiana
Columbus Pediatric Associates, Columbus, Indiana
Doctors Park Family Medicine, Columbus, Indiana
Hospital Care Physicians, Columbus, Indiana
Kavelman Family Medicine, Columbus, Indiana
Koopman Family Medicine, Columbus, Indiana
Mental Health Services, Columbus, Indiana
Nashville Family Medicine, Columbus, Indiana
Neurology and Sleep Sciences, Columbus, Indiana
OB/GYN Associates of Columbus, Columbus, Indiana
Our Hospice of South Central Indiana, Columbus, Indiana
PromptMed, Columbus, Indiana
Rau Family Medicine, Columbus, Indiana
Sandcrest Family Medicine, Columbus, Indiana
Southern Indiana Heart and Vascular, Columbus, Indiana
Southern Indiana OB/GYN, Columbus, Indiana
Southern Indiana Nephrology and Hypertension, Columbus, Indiana
Speech Therapy & Audiology, Columbus, Indiana
VIMCare Clinic, Columbus, Indiana
WellConnect, Columbus, Indiana
Wound Center, Columbus, Indiana

Specialties
CRH medical specialties include: 
 Pulmonology
 Orthopedics
 Cardiology & Heart Surgery
 Gastroenterology & GI Surgery
 Bariatrics
 Cancer
 Breast Health
 Robotic Surgery

History
June 7, 2008, CRH experienced a flood of historic magnitude, causing severe damage to the hospital. The flood prompted the evacuation of 157 patients, and forced the hospital to shut down, with damages totaling over $180 million. Due to the flood, certain areas had been destroyed such as the laboratory, pharmacy, information services, food services, and mechanical and electrical systems.

An interim emergency department was opened up in August 2008, and on October 27, Columbus Regional Hospital reopened with a new and improved facility.

In 2012, the Federal Emergency Management Agency backed a project to protect CRH from any future flooding. 15 flood gates were installed around the campus in order to keep water out. Today, CRH is a fully functioning, 225-bed not-for-profit, providing emergency and surgical services and comprehensive care.

WellConnect
In 2014, Columbus Regional Health opened up a new walk-in clinic called WellConnect in the downtown area of Columbus, Indiana. In an effort to keep up with the times, CRH decided to create a new facility with a different approach on delivering health care services. The end result was derived from focus groups and surveys, to the benefit of those living in the downtown area.

WellConnect is a place where patients can meet with wellness experts and healthcare professionals. They offer walk-in care for minor illnesses, wellness programs, massage therapy, and cooking demonstrations. It is open to the public, Monday through Friday.

Awards and recognition
In 2014, CRH received an award for Excellence in Supply Chain Management from VHA Inc.

The Indiana Chamber of Commerce added Columbus Regional Health to Indiana's Best Places to Work Hall of Fame in 2014.

See also
Official website

References

Hospital buildings completed in 1917
Hospitals in Indiana